Ludlow is a town in Ehlanzeni District Municipality in the Mpumalanga province of South Africa. It is a famous landmark and historical place

References

Populated places in the Bushbuckridge Local Municipality